Timothy Derijck (born 25 May 1987) is a Belgian professional footballer who plays as a centre-back for Belgian First Division A club Zulte Waregem.

Club career

Early career
Derijck is a product of the Anderlecht youth academy, but left the Brussels giants for Feyenoord before making it into the first team. He also wore the jerseys of Dender and NAC Breda before joining ADO Den Haag in January 2009. It was where he developed himself into one of the most consistent defenders in the Eredivisie.

PSV Eindhoven
On 15 August 2011, PSV Eindhoven announced the signing of Derijck on a four-year contract from ADO Den Haag for a fee of €750,000. He was given the number 18 shirt. He made his debut on 21 August 2011 in PSV's 3–0 win over his former club Den Haag. He scored his first competitive goal for PSV in a 3–2 win over Achilles '29 on 27 September in the 2012–13 KNVB Beker. His first Eredivise goal for PSV was an equalizer against PEC Zwolle on 28 October 2012.

On 19 July 2013, it was announced that Derijck was sent on loan to FC Utrecht until the end of the season.

Return to ADO Den Haag
On 26 August 2014, Derijck returned to his former club ADO Den Haag. He signed a two-year deal on a free transfer.

Zulte Waregem
In June 2016, Derijck joined Belgian side Zulte Waregem.

Gent
In August 2018, Derijck joined Gent.

Return to Zulte Waregem
On 6 January 2022, Derijck returned to Zulte Waregem on a one-year contract, with an option for a second year. He returned to the pitch as a starter for Waregem in a 0–0 home draw against Oostende on 9 February. Derijck was a starter for the club for the remainder of the 2021–22 season, but saw himself increasingly demoted to the bench after suffering some injuries early on in the 2022–23 season as Modou Tambedou and Borja López were preferred at centre-back under new head coach Mbaye Leye. In October and November 2022, Lukas Willen also surpassed Derijck in the depth chart.

International career
On 5 September 2011, he received his first call up to the senior Belgium national team for the friendly match against the United States. Coach Georges Leekens called him to replace the injured Jan Vertonghen. However, he was an unused substitute in a 1–1 draw.

Honours
Zulte Waregem
 Belgian Cup: 2016–17

PSV Eindhoven
 KNVB Cup: 2011–12
 Johan Cruyff Shield: 2012

References

Timothy Derijck verlaat ADO en zet carrière voort bij Zulte Waregem, omroepwest.nl, 9 June 2016

External links
 Voetbal International profile 
 Belgium Stats at Belgian FA
 

Living people
1987 births
Association football central defenders
Belgian footballers
Belgium under-21 international footballers
Belgium youth international footballers
Belgian Pro League players
Eredivisie players
Eerste Divisie players
Feyenoord players
NAC Breda players
F.C.V. Dender E.H. players
ADO Den Haag players
PSV Eindhoven players
Jong PSV players
FC Utrecht players
S.V. Zulte Waregem players
K.A.A. Gent players
K.V. Kortrijk players
Belgian expatriate footballers
Expatriate footballers in the Netherlands
Belgian expatriate sportspeople in the Netherlands